Peter Andreas Brandt (14 June 1792 – 20 September 1862) was a Norwegian painter and illustrator. He worked as an illustrator with the Danish paleontologist Peter Wilhelm Lund in Brazil, producing works such as a map of the Lapa Vermelha cavern. Brant lived in the Brazilian town of Lagoa Santa, where he is buried.

References 

Birgitte Holten, Michael Sterll og Jon Fjeldså (red.): Den forsvundne maler. P.W. Lund og P.A. Brandt i Brasilien, Museum Tusculanums Forlag 2003, 

Norwegian illustrators
19th-century Norwegian painters
People from Trondheim
1792 births
1862 deaths
Norwegian male painters
19th-century Norwegian male artists